Asar Isayevich Eppel (11 January 1935 – 20 February 2012) was a Russian writer and translator.

Biography
Eppel was born in Ostankino, a suburb of Moscow. He studied architecture at the Institute of Civil Engineering. He worked as a translator in the Soviet Union, being unable to publish his fictional works under the Soviet Government. He translated Bruno Schulz and Wisława Szymborska from the Polish, the foreign language he is most proficient in, and poems from Petrarch, Boccaccio, Rudyard Kipling and Berthold Brecht.

His works of fiction include the story The Grassy Street (1996) and the novel The Mushroom of My Life (2001).

Eppel died, aged 77, in Moscow.

English translations
The Grassy Street, The GLAS Series, Vol 18, 1998.
Red Caviar Sandwiches, Russian Short Stories from Pushkin to Buida, Penguin Classics, 2005.

References

1935 births
2012 deaths
Soviet translators
Russian male novelists
Russian male short story writers
Writers from Moscow
20th-century Russian translators
20th-century novelists
20th-century Russian short story writers
20th-century Russian male writers